Barrow Street may refer to:
 Barrow Street (Manhattan), an arts area in the West Village
 Barrow Street, Dublin, Dublin, and the home of Ireland's National Performing Arts School, Google Europe, and rock band U2's The Factory studio complex, among many other high-profile tenants
 Barrow Street, Wiltshire, a village in the south of England
 Barrow Street Press, a New York–based publisher of poetry books
Barrow Street (magazine), a literary journal published by Barrow Street Press
 Barrow Street Theatre, New York